José María Salmerón Morales (born 23 October 1966) is a Spanish retired footballer who played as a winger, and is a manager.

Formed at Real Madrid, where he made one first-team appearance and represented the reserves in the Segunda División, he also represented Tenerife in La Liga.

Salmerón's managerial career of over two decades was mainly spent in the lower leagues, with spells at four teams in the second division.

Club career
Born in Almería, Andalusia, Salmerón joined Real Madrid's youth setup in 1980, after a recommendation from Vicente del Bosque. On 9 September 1984, while still a junior, he made his first team – and La Liga – debut, starting and playing the full 90 minutes in a 1–1 away draw against Sporting de Gijón; the weekend had been affected by a professionals' strike, meaning that many youths made their debuts.

However, Salmerón later suffered with injuries, and spent the vast majority of his spell with the reserves in Segunda División. He moved to CD Tenerife in the 1989 summer, but after being again injury prone, only appeared sparingly.

Salmerón subsequently represented Levante UD and UE Sant Andreu in Segunda División B, and CP Almería in Tercera División. He retired with the latter in 1995, aged only 29, after achieving promotion to the third level.

Managerial career
Salmerón started his managerial career with newly formed UD Almería in 1999, as the club were already relegated from the third level. He remained in charge in the following season, as the Rojiblancos were promoted at first attempt.

In June 2003, after a stint at UD San Sebastián de los Reyes, Salmerón was appointed assistant manager at Polideportivo Ejido. In November, he was appointed as caretaker manager, replacing fired Quique Setién. Shortly after, he returned to his previous duties after the appointment of Julián Rubio as manager; in June, after the latter's dismissal, he was again caretaker.

On 17 November 2005 Salmerón was again appointed as Poli manager, remaining in charge for the season and finishing 15th. On 26 December 2006 he was appointed at the helm of Lorca Deportiva CF.

After being relegated, Salmerón moved back to the Merengues as the C-team's manager in July 2007. On 26 February 2008 he moved to Deportivo Alavés, narrowly avoiding the drop but being sacked in December.

On 20 January 2010 Salmerón returned to Almería, being appointed manager with the reserves. He renewed his link in July, but was relieved from his duties in November.

On 14 November 2012 Salmerón was appointed at the helm of CF Fuenlabrada, but stepped down in May, after the club's relegation to the fourth level. On 15 June 2015, after nearly two years without a club, he was named CP Cacereño manager, but resigned after only eight days and moved to UCAM Murcia CF on 2 July.

In his first season at UCAM, Salmerón won their first promotion to the second tier with a play-off semi-final win over former club Castilla, then took the championship title for good measure on 8 June 2016 with a penalty shootout victory against CF Reus Deportiu. On 11 December that year, he was dismissed, having taken 18 points from as many games with the club second from bottom.

Salmerón remained in the city, taking the job at third-tier Real Murcia CF on 16 October 2017. The following June, after play-off quarter-final elimination by Elche CF, his contract was not renewed. He then became manager of Recreativo de Huelva and won their group, but was eliminated in the semi-finals of the post-season by CD Mirandés, and turned down a new deal in June 2019.

On 12 October 2019, Salmerón returned to work at Burgos CF. Nine months later he was hired again by UCAM with the goal of promotion, but lost 1–0 to UD Ibiza in the play-off final on 23 May 2021.

Following a league restructuring, UCAM remained in the third tier in the new Primera División RFEF, while Salmerón was dismissed on 6 November 2021, having taken three wins and as many draws in the first 11 games of the season. A year later, he was hired in the same division at CD Badajoz.

Managerial statistics

Honours
UCAM Murcia
Segunda División B: 2015–16

References

External links

1966 births
Living people
Footballers from Almería
Spanish footballers
Association football wingers
La Liga players
Segunda División players
Segunda División B players
Tercera División players
Real Madrid CF players
Real Madrid Castilla footballers
CD Tenerife players
Levante UD footballers
UE Sant Andreu footballers
CP Almería players
Spanish football managers
Segunda División managers
Primera Federación managers
Segunda División B managers
UD Almería managers
Polideportivo Ejido managers
Deportivo Alavés managers
Real Madrid C managers
UD Almería B managers
CF Fuenlabrada managers
Lorca Deportiva CF managers
CP Cacereño managers
UCAM Murcia CF managers
Real Murcia managers
Recreativo de Huelva managers
Burgos CF managers
CD Badajoz managers